Inge Johannes Tjernes Johansen (21 May 1928 – 5 December 2018) was a Norwegian electrical engineer and academician.

Career
Johansen was born in Gjerpen to an electrician and a homemaker. He took the siv.ing. degree, and in 1957 the dr.techn. degree. From 1959 to 1985, he was professor of high voltage technology at the Norwegian Institute of Technology. From 1975 he was the deputy rector, from 1976-84 he served as rector, and from 1985-89 was the director of the NTNF. In 1990, he returned to academia as a professor of elkraftteknikk. He chaired the Statoil board from 1984 to 1987, but resigned together with the rest of the board members after they lost control over spending in the Mongstad project.

Johansen contributed to the establishment of Kathmandu University, for which a university building was named after him: the Prof. Inge Johansen Engineering Block. 

Johansen was decorated in 1981 as a Commander of the Order of St. Olav for his work in technical research and education in Norway.

Bibliography
 "Energi og Etikk -Etiske perspektiver på elforsyning", Forlaget Press, 2006

References

Links
 Inge Johansen at NTNU.no
 Inge Johansen, private archive at (University Library of Trondheim, Dorabiblioteket)

1928 births
2018 deaths
Norwegian electrical engineers
Academic staff of the Norwegian Institute of Technology
Rectors of the Norwegian University of Science and Technology
People from Skien
Equinor people